Sabandan (also Romanized as Sānbadān; also known as Sūneh Verdī) is a village in Zhan Rural District, in the Central District of Dorud County, Lorestan Province, Iran. At the 2006 census, its population was 350, in 76 families.

References 

Towns and villages in Dorud County